The Wetzsteinhorn (also known as Sex des Molettes) is a mountain of the Bernese Alps, overlooking the lake of Tseuzier in the canton of Valais.

References

External links
 Wetzsteinhorn on Hikr

Mountains of the Alps
Mountains of Switzerland
Mountains of Valais
Two-thousanders of Switzerland